DNA replication complex GINS protein PSF1 is a protein that in humans is encoded by the GINS1 gene.

References

Further reading